Savage Pampas is a 1966 American Western film directed by Hugo Fregonese and starring Robert Taylor, Ron Randell and Marc Lawrence. The film was a co-production between Argentina, Spain and the United States, and was a remake of the 1945 Argentine film of the same title which Fregonese had co-directed. The film's location shooting took place in Spain, a popular location for westerns during the era. The film's action is set in the Argentinian Pampas around the time of the Conquest of the Desert.

Plot
Set during the 1870s, life is hard for soldiers on the outskirts of Argentinean control. The pragmatic Captain Martin struggles to retain control over a ragtag Argentinean Army, made up of largely conscripted criminals. Joined by Lt. Del Río, who just graduated from the newly created Military Institute of Buenos Aires, Cpt. Martin faces mass desertions due to soldiers refusing to serve without women at the garrisons.

These desperate men slip off in the night to join the ranks of Padrón, a charismatic bandit who leads an army made up of indigenous fighters and army deserters. Padrón has a standing offer of a woman to every soldier who changes sides, and many men have taken notice. Loyalties are divided, until Cpt. Martin looks to turn the tables: by bringing women to his own men.

Cast

Production
In 1958 it was announced Stephen Barclay would produce 12 films in Argentina with Mendoza Films and Guaranteed Pictures. They were to include Savage Pampas which was to be produced and directed by Hugo Fregonese. Pampas was based on a true story about an encounter between white settlers and Indians in 1830 Argentina.

The film was not made for another decade.

See also
List of American films of 1966

References

Bibliography 
 Pitts, Michael R. Western Movies: A Guide to 5,105 Feature Films. McFarland, 2012.

External links 

Savage Pampas at Letterbox DVD

1966 films
American Western (genre) films
American historical films
Argentine Western (genre) films
Argentine historical films
Spanish Western (genre) films
Spanish historical films
1960s historical films
1966 Western (genre) films
1960s English-language films
English-language Argentine films
English-language Spanish films
Films directed by Hugo Fregonese
Films set in Argentina
Films set in the 19th century
Remakes of Argentine films
American remakes of Argentine films
1960s American films
1960s Spanish films
1960s Argentine films